Oriel High School is a maintained community secondary school for pupils aged 11 to 18. It opened in September 2004 as part of a reorganisation of secondary education in Crawley, catering for just 370 pupils in years 7 and 8. It was expected to grow to around 1450 pupils by 2009. It then grew to roughly 1600 students by 2015, and expanded once more to 2100 students in 2021. Oriel is the highest Ofsted rated secondary school in Crawley.

Location
The school is located at Maidenbower Lane in the Maidenbower neighbourhood of Crawley, West Sussex.

History

The school was opened by West Sussex County Council in early 2004 following a wholesale review of education provision in Crawley. After more than twenty years of providing education in a three-tier structure of first and middle Schools, with pupils transferring to secondary school at age twelve, the council reverted to the more traditional two-tier structure. Part of the plan for accommodating the larger number of pupils in secondary education in the town was to build a new school for the newly developed neighbourhood of Maidenbower. Two primary schools and one middle school had operated in the neighbourhood for some time, but secondary pupils had to travel to Hazelwick School or Thomas Bennett Community College

Oriel High School opened to pupils in September 2004, initially for an intake of around 370 pupils in years 7 and 8. The school continues to accept a new entry of pupils in each academic year, gradually increasing the provision offered. A sixth-form opened in 2008, with a full 11–18 school operating by 2009.

Organisation
The school is organised into Learning Communities – all four of which are named for continents.
Pupils are taught by specialist teachers, and also belong to a Learning Mentor Groups, which are supervised by a Pastoral Leader.

Most pupils attending the school live within the catchment area, and transfer from one of the local junior schools: Maidenbower Junior School, Pound Hill Junior School, and Milton Mount Primary School. Other pupils travel from nearby neighbourhoods such as Three Bridges, Furnace Green, Tilgate, Broadfield, Ifield and Bewbush. The school is managed by a team of 10 senior management.

Student Headship Team
Each year, Oriel High School selects a Student Headship Team, usually composed of three boys and three girls. The team is appointed by their predecessors after a selection process involving written applications and interviews. Their main responsibilities include organising end of term assemblies; leading the prefect team; representing the student voice to the headteacher and governing body of the school. They also participate in community events on behalf of the school, and speak from a student's point of view at meetings of parents.

Learning communities
Oriel is divided into four Learning Communities which are led by an Assistant head teacher.

Headteachers
2004–2009 : Gillian Smith
2009–present : Philip Stack

Oriel Sixth Form is the newest Sixth Form college in Crawley for students aged 16 to 18. It opened in September 2008 as part of the development and expansion of Oriel High School. The sixth form caters for Year 12 and 13, delivering over 40 courses at Advanced Level, GCSE and BTEC level for students.

Location 
The school is located at Maidenbower Lane in the Maidenbower neighbourhood of Crawley, West Sussex. With the Student access from Matthews Drive.

Sixth form 

The Sixth Form was opened by West Sussex County Council in 2008 following the opening on Oriel High School in 2004. When Oriel first opened it only catered for Years 7 and 8, thus taking it 4 years to grow to allow a Sixth Form to open. In 2008 the Sixth Form only had one year group, Year 12. But in 2009 all year groups in both Oriel High School and the Sixth Form were full, taking it 5 years to reach full capacity after the school was founded by Ms Gillian Smith as the first Headteacher. With her task of establishing a fully maintained school complete she retired from education in July 2009 after taking a Civil Service role for HM Government.

The Sixth Form is not organised into Learning Communities like Oriel High School, however they are split in half for supervisory purposes only. The Headteacher and both Deputy Heads are the most senior member of staff for Oriel Sixth Form, however there is an appointed Assistant Head of Sixth who is directly in charge.  Students are taught by specialist teachers, and also belong to a vertically-mixed Personal Tutor Group, which are supervised by a Senior VIth Tutor.

Oriel Sixth Form does not require its students to wear the Oriel Tartan uniform, the Oriel Sixth Form committee agreed that students must adhere to a smart casual attire. Occasionally the Head of Sixth will request students to dress formally.

References

External links
 Oriel High School website

2004 establishments in England
Secondary Schools in Crawley
Secondary schools in West Sussex
Buildings and structures in Crawley
Educational institutions established in 2004
Community schools in West Sussex